Caloosahatchee Manuscripts is the title of a sculpture designed by American artist Jim Sanborn. It is currently located at the Old Post Office Building in Fort Myers, Florida.

Medium
The sculpture is bronze with text cut from a water jet cutter, and a pinpoint light source.

References

Sculptures by Jim Sanborn
Bronze sculptures in Florida
2001 sculptures
2001 establishments in Florida